Mount Fito (Mauga Fito) is the second-highest mountain on the island of Upolu in Samoa. It is located in the O Le Pupu-Puʿe National Park in the Atua district and has a height of 1149m. Fito was long-believed to be Upolu's highest point, but a visit by the Samoa Conservation Society in 2022 determined it to be the second-highest, just 10m shorter than nearby Mount Vaivai.

In 1978 a Cessna aircraft operated by South Pacific Island Airways crashed into the mountain, killing all 11 people on board.

References

Mountains of Samoa
Volcanoes of Samoa
Upolu
Atua (district)